This is a list of earthquakes in 1980. Only earthquakes of magnitude 6 or above are included, unless they result in damage and/or casualties, or are notable for some other reason. Events in remote areas will not be listed but included in statistics and maps. Countries are entered on the lists in order of their status in this particular year. All dates are listed according to UTC time. Maximum intensities are indicated on the Mercalli intensity scale and are sourced from United States Geological Survey (USGS) ShakeMap data. Although activity was once again below average, 1980 had several deadly events which helped the overall number of deaths surpass 10,000. The largest of just 6 magnitude 7.0+ events measured 7.9 and struck the Solomon Islands in July. The last quarter of the year had the bulk of the deaths. Algeria had its largest earthquake in October. The magnitude 7.3 event caused 5,000 deaths. A fortnight later Mexico suffered 300 lost lives. At the end of November southern Italy was struck by a magnitude 6.9 earthquake which led to nearly 4,700 deaths. Other areas experiencing deaths were Portugal and Nepal.

By death toll

Listed are earthquakes with at least 10 dead.

By magnitude

Listed are earthquakes with at least 7.0 magnitude.

By month

January

February

March

April

May

June

July

August

September

October

November

December

References

External links 

1980
1980 earthquakes
1980